Toni Markić (born 25 October 1990) is a Bosnian-Herzegovinian footballer who plays as a defender.

Club career
He made his Veikkausliiga debut for KuPS on 12 April 2014 in a game against HJK.

On 26 July 2019, he signed with Viterbese.

On 7 August 2021 he joined Foggia on a two-year contract.

International career
Markić was a youth international for Bosnia and Herzegovina U-19 and Bosnia and Herzegovina U-21.

References

External links
 

1990 births
Living people
People from Ljubuški
Croats of Bosnia and Herzegovina
Bosnia and Herzegovina footballers
Association football defenders
Premier League of Bosnia and Herzegovina players
FK Borac Banja Luka players
NK Široki Brijeg players
HŠK Zrinjski Mostar players
FK Olimpik players
Veikkausliiga players
Kuopion Palloseura players
I liga players
Zawisza Bydgoszcz players
Croatian Football League players
HNK Cibalia players
Serie C players
A.S. Bisceglie Calcio 1913 players
U.S. Viterbese 1908 players
Calcio Foggia 1920 players
Bosnia and Herzegovina expatriate footballers
Expatriate footballers in Finland
Bosnia and Herzegovina expatriate sportspeople in Finland
Expatriate footballers in Poland
Bosnia and Herzegovina expatriate sportspeople in Poland
Expatriate footballers in Croatia
Bosnia and Herzegovina expatriate sportspeople in Croatia
Expatriate footballers in Italy
Bosnia and Herzegovina expatriate sportspeople in Italy
Bosnia and Herzegovina youth international footballers
Bosnia and Herzegovina under-21 international footballers